The 1986 NBL season was the eighth season of competition since its establishment in 1979. A total of 14 teams contested the league.

Clubs
The NBL had 14 clubs spread across all Australian states and territories with the exception of the Northern Territory.

Regular season
The home and away season took place over 21 rounds between 25 April 1986 and 28 September 1986.

The Adelaide 36ers had a near perfect regular season recording a 24–2 win–loss record which included an undefeated 13-0 home record at the Apollo Stadium, a feat not matched before or since in the NBL. Adelaide's only two losses of the year came away in Round 6 when they lost 89–87 to the West Sydney Westars in Sydney, and in Round 11 against the Coburg Giants in Melbourne when they went down 116–114. Both the Westars and Giants won the games on last second baskets. The 36ers were easily the best offensive team in the league, averaging 116 points per game (11.5 points more per game than the next best team, the Brisbane Bullets), while they had the 5th best defence in the NBL only giving up 96.5 points per game.

6'5" (196 cm) Brisbane Bullets swingman Leroy Loggins was selected as the NBL's Most Valuable Player. Loggins averaged 29.8 points, 8.9 rebounds, 3.1 assists, 3.3 steals and 1.3 blocks per game in 1986. It was Loggins' 2nd NBL MVP award having also won in 1984.

Round 1

|- bgcolor="#CCCCFF" font size=1
!width=90| Date
!width=180| Home
!width=60| Score
!width=180| Away
!width=260| Venue
!width=70| Crowd
!width=70| Box Score

Round 2

|- bgcolor="#CCCCFF" font size=1
!width=90| Date
!width=180| Home
!width=60| Score
!width=180| Away
!width=260| Venue
!width=70| Crowd
!width=70| Box Score

Round 3

|- bgcolor="#CCCCFF" font size=1
!width=90| Date
!width=180| Home
!width=60| Score
!width=180| Away
!width=260| Venue
!width=70| Crowd
!width=70| Box Score

Round 4

|- bgcolor="#CCCCFF" font size=1
!width=90| Date
!width=180| Home
!width=60| Score
!width=180| Away
!width=260| Venue
!width=70| Crowd
!width=70| Box Score

Round 5

|- bgcolor="#CCCCFF" font size=1
!width=90| Date
!width=180| Home
!width=60| Score
!width=180| Away
!width=260| Venue
!width=70| Crowd
!width=70| Box Score

Round 6

|- bgcolor="#CCCCFF" font size=1
!width=90| Date
!width=180| Home
!width=60| Score
!width=180| Away
!width=260| Venue
!width=70| Crowd
!width=70| Box Score

Round 7

|- bgcolor="#CCCCFF" font size=1
!width=90| Date
!width=180| Home
!width=60| Score
!width=180| Away
!width=260| Venue
!width=70| Crowd
!width=70| Box Score

Round 8

|- bgcolor="#CCCCFF" font size=1
!width=90| Date
!width=180| Home
!width=60| Score
!width=180| Away
!width=260| Venue
!width=70| Crowd
!width=70| Box Score

Round 9

|- bgcolor="#CCCCFF" font size=1
!width=90| Date
!width=180| Home
!width=60| Score
!width=180| Away
!width=260| Venue
!width=70| Crowd
!width=70| Box Score

Round 10

|- bgcolor="#CCCCFF" font size=1
!width=90| Date
!width=180| Home
!width=60| Score
!width=180| Away
!width=260| Venue
!width=70| Crowd
!width=70| Box Score

Round 11

|- bgcolor="#CCCCFF" font size=1
!width=90| Date
!width=180| Home
!width=60| Score
!width=180| Away
!width=260| Venue
!width=70| Crowd
!width=70| Box Score

Round 12

|- bgcolor="#CCCCFF" font size=1
!width=90| Date
!width=180| Home
!width=60| Score
!width=180| Away
!width=260| Venue
!width=70| Crowd
!width=70| Box Score

Round 13

|- bgcolor="#CCCCFF" font size=1
!width=90| Date
!width=180| Home
!width=60| Score
!width=180| Away
!width=260| Venue
!width=70| Crowd
!width=70| Box Score

Round 14

|- bgcolor="#CCCCFF" font size=1
!width=90| Date
!width=180| Home
!width=60| Score
!width=180| Away
!width=260| Venue
!width=70| Crowd
!width=70| Box Score

Round 15

|- bgcolor="#CCCCFF" font size=1
!width=90| Date
!width=180| Home
!width=60| Score
!width=180| Away
!width=260| Venue
!width=70| Crowd
!width=70| Box Score

Round 16

|- bgcolor="#CCCCFF" font size=1
!width=90| Date
!width=180| Home
!width=60| Score
!width=180| Away
!width=260| Venue
!width=70| Crowd
!width=70| Box Score

Round 17

|- bgcolor="#CCCCFF" font size=1
!width=90| Date
!width=180| Home
!width=60| Score
!width=180| Away
!width=260| Venue
!width=70| Crowd
!width=70| Box Score

Round 18

|- bgcolor="#CCCCFF" font size=1
!width=90| Date
!width=180| Home
!width=60| Score
!width=180| Away
!width=260| Venue
!width=70| Crowd
!width=70| Box Score

Round 19

|- bgcolor="#CCCCFF" font size=1
!width=90| Date
!width=180| Home
!width=60| Score
!width=180| Away
!width=260| Venue
!width=70| Crowd
!width=70| Box Score

Round 20

|- bgcolor="#CCCCFF" font size=1
!width=90| Date
!width=180| Home
!width=60| Score
!width=180| Away
!width=260| Venue
!width=70| Crowd
!width=70| Box Score

Round 21

|- bgcolor="#CCCCFF" font size=1
!width=90| Date
!width=180| Home
!width=60| Score
!width=180| Away
!width=260| Venue
!width=70| Crowd
!width=70| Box Score

Ladder

The NBL tie-breaker system as outlined in the NBL Rules and Regulations states that in the case of an identical win–loss record, the results in games played between the teams will determine order of seeding.

1Head-to-Head between West Sydney Westars and Illawarra Hawks (1-1). West Sydney Westars won For and Against (+8).

23-way Head-to-Head between Sydney Supersonics (3-1), Geelong Cats (2-2) and Coburg Giants (1-3).

Finals

Playoff bracket

There were two elimination finals, two semi-finals, and then best of three grand final. All of the Elimination-finals and Semi-finals were sudden death. As the top two teams in the regular season the Adelaide 36ers and Canberra Cannons automatically qualified to host a home Semi-final.

Elimination Finals

|- bgcolor="#CCCCFF" font size=1
!width=90| Date
!width=180| Home
!width=60| Score
!width=180| Away
!width=260| Venue
!width=70| Crowd
!width=70| Box Score

Semi-finals

|- bgcolor="#CCCCFF" font size=1
!width=90| Date
!width=180| Home
!width=60| Score
!width=180| Away
!width=260| Venue
!width=70| Crowd
!width=70| Box Score

Grand Final
After being a single game from 1979-1985, 1986 saw the establishment of the best of three Grand Final series. Game 1 in Brisbane saw a then NBL record attendance of over 11,000. The game went into overtime with the 36ers coming out on top with a 122-119 win. Game 2 saw Adelaide lose its only game at home for the season when the Bullets kept the series alive with a 104-83 win. Adelaide wrapped up its first NBL Championship with a 113-91 win in Game 3 at the Apollo Stadium.

Regular season MVP winner, Brisbane's Leroy Loggins, fouled out of both Games 1 and 3. Adelaide import Power forward Mark Davis was selected as the Grand Final MVP. Davis averaged 25.0 points, 19.3 rebounds and 1.6 assists over the series.

|- bgcolor="#CCCCFF" font size=1
!width=90| Date
!width=180| Home
!width=60| Score
!width=180| Away
!width=260| Venue
!width=70| Crowd
!width=70| Box Score

1986 NBL statistics leaders

NBL awards
Most Valuable Player: Leroy Loggins, Brisbane Bullets
Most Valuable Player Grand Final: Mark Davis, Adelaide 36ers
Rookie of the Year: Steve Lunardon, Nunawading Spectres
Coach of the Year: Ken Cole, Adelaide 36ers

All NBL Team

References

 
NBL